Marc Antoine Timeroy (22 August 1793, La Frette, Isère – 13 November 1856, Lyon) was a French botanist.

A bookkeeper by trade, he was educated in botany by a Lyon pharmacist named Thevenin. Timeroy is remembered for his intensive investigations of flora in the vicinity of Lyon.

From 1846 until his death he was a member of the Société linnéenne de Lyon, from which he served as a botanical curator in 1852–55. From 1849 to 1855 he was a member of the Société d'agriculture de Lyon. After his death, his biography was composed by Étienne Mulsant ("Notice sur Marc-Antoine Timeroy", F. Dumoulin 1859).

In 1860 the genus Timeroyea (syn: Pisonia) was named after him by Jean Xavier Hyacinthe Montrouzier. Also, plants with the specific epithet of timeroyi are named in his honor, an example being Galium timeroyi.

References 

1793 births
1856 deaths
19th-century French botanists
People from Isère